East Nusa Tenggara is the southernmost province of Indonesia. It comprises the eastern portion of the Lesser Sunda Islands, facing the Indian Ocean in the south and the Flores Sea in the north. It consists of more than 500 islands, with the largest ones being Sumba, Flores, and the western part of Timor; the latter shares a land border with the separate nation of East Timor. The province is subdivided into twenty-one regencies and the regency-level city of Kupang, which is the capital and largest city.

A Christian-majority region, East Nusa Tenggara is the only Indonesian province where Roman Catholicism is the predominant religion. The province has a total area of 47,931.54 km2 and a population of 5,325,566 at the 2020 Census; the official estimate as at mid 2022 was 5,466,285. Economically, East Nusa Tenggara still remains one of the least developed provinces in Indonesia. It currently focuses on expanding the tourism sector, with the most well-known attractions including Labuan Bajo, Komodo National Park, and Mount Kelimutu.

History 
After the declaration of Indonesian independence in 1945, the eastern part of Indonesia declared the State of East Indonesia. The state was further included in the United States of Indonesia as part of the agreement with the Dutch contained in the transfer of sovereignty to Indonesia in 1949.

In 1950, United States of Indonesia dissolved itself into a unitary state and began to divide its component area into provinces. In 1958, by Indonesian law (Undang-Undang) No. 64/1958, three provinces were established in the Lesser Sunda Islands: Bali, West Nusa Tenggara and East Nusa Tenggara. The area of East Nusa Tenggara province included the western part of Timor island, Flores, Sumba and other several small islands in the region. The province was originally sub-divided into twelve regencies, but on 11 April 1996, the City of Kupang, was separated from Kupang Regency and given regency-level status.

Following the fall of the Suharto regime in 1998 and the passage of a new regional autonomy law, there was a dramatic subdividing (known as pemekaran) of regional governments across Indonesia, at both provincial and regency level. Since 1998, nine new regencies were created in East Nusa Tenggara by the division of existing regencies:
On 4 October 1999, a new Lembata Regency was formed after the division of the East Flores Regency.
On 10 April 2002, Rote Island and adjacent islands were split off from Kupang Regency, to form a new Rote Ndao Regency.
On 25 February 2003, Manggarai Regency was split into two and a new West Manggarai Regency was established.
On 2 January 2007, the administration of East Nusa Tenggara province was expanded by the establishment of three new regencies – Central Sumba and Southwest Sumba (both cut out of West Sumba Regency), and Nagekeo (cut out of Ngada Regency).
On 17 July 2007 a new regency of East Manggarai was cut out of Manggarai Regency.
On 29 October 2008 a further regency – Sabu Raijua (comprising the Savu Islands group) – was formed from part of the remaining Kupang Regency.
On 14 December 2012 yet another regency – Malaka – was created out of the southern half of Belu Regency.

Therefore, as from early 2013, there are twenty-one regencies plus the one autonomous city (Kupang) in the province.

Geography 

Located in the east of Lesser Sunda Islands, East Nusa Tenggara faces the Indian Ocean in the south and the Flores Sea in the north. The province is bordered by other provinces, in the west by West Nusa Tenggara and in the east by the southern part of Maluku and the independent nation of East Timor (Timor-Leste).

The province consists of about 566 islands, the largest and most dominant are Flores, Sumba, and the western part of Timor. The smaller islands include Adonara, Alor, Komodo, Lembata (formerly called Lomblen), Menipo, Raijua, Rincah, Rote Island (the southernmost island in Indonesia), Savu, Semau, and Solor. The highest point in the province is Mount Mutis in the South Central Timor Regency, 2,427 meters above sea level.

Administrative divisions 
The province is divided into twenty-one regencies and one independent city. These are listed below with their areas and their populations at the 2010 Census and the 2020 Census, together with the official estimates as at mid 2022.

List of Provincial Governors 
Below is a list of Governors who have held office in the East Nusa Tenggara.
W. J. Lala Mentik (1960–1965)
El Tari (1966–1978)
Ben Mboi (1978–1988)
Hendrik Fernandez (1988–1993)
Herman Musakabe (1993–1998)
Piet Alexander Tallo (1998–2008)
Frans Lebu Raya (2008–2018)
Victor Laiskodat (2018–present)

Demographics 

The Census population of the province was 4,683,827 in 2010 and 5,325,566 in 2020, but the most recent estimate was 5,466,285 (as at mid 2022).

The secondary school enrolment rate of 39% is dramatically below the Indonesian average (80% in 2003/04, according to UNESCO). Lack of clean drinking water, sanitation, and health facilities means that child malnutrition (32%) and child mortality (71 per 1000) are higher than in most of the rest of Indonesia.  Maternal and infant mortality are high partly because of poor access to health facilities in isolated rural areas.  Malaria is a significant problem in parts of the province with the result that the rate of infant mortality caused by malaria, in recent years, has been the highest across Indonesia.

Economy 
By several economic indicators, the provincial economy is weaker than the Indonesian average with high inflation (15%), unemployment (30%) and interest rates (22-24%), making it one of the poorest provinces in Indonesia.

Agriculture 

The main part of the economic activity in the province is subsistence agriculture. Important local crops include corn and some smallholder plantation crops such as coffee. In some places such as Sumba, the lontar palm (Borassus flabellifer) dominates local agricultural activities and is a very important part of the local economy. In these areas, the lontar palm provides timber and thatching as well as food in the form of fruits, and palm sugar which is obtained by tapping the fruit stems. The sugary sap can be used to make alcoholic drinks. In other parts of the province such as West Manggarai, the sugar palm (Arenga pinnata) has a useful role in the local economy. The degree of mechanization in agriculture is low. Large animals (buffaloes, horses) are widely used throughout the province.

Natural resources 
A significant part of the economic activity in the province involves the development of natural resources, including forestry and numerous local mining ventures. Some of the activity is controversial, however, because regulatory controls over the use of natural resources are not always effective. There have been disputes in some areas over the use of land. Manganese mining, for example in the central part of the island of Timor has been controversial. Nearby, in the Mount Mutis area to the east of Kupang, amongst some local groups there is a concern at the way local resources are being developed by mining companies.

There is also significant activity in the informal mining sector. Across the province, villagers sometimes exploit localized opportunities to undertake unregulated mining or mineral-based projects. In West Timor, for example, in the South Central Timor Regency, villagers living near the south coast in the Kolbano area south of the town of Soe sometimes collect colored stones which, in turn, are sold to companies that export the stones to countries such as Australia, China, Malaysia, Singapore, and elsewhere.

The cultivation of seaweed is an important activity in some parts of the province. In the Alor Islands, for example, village-based informal cultivation of seaweed helps boost local incomes. Much of the seaweed is exported in unprocessed form, including to countries such as Japan in north Asia. One view is that more needs to be done to encourage further domestic processing of the seaweed to add value before export; however, the local skills and facilities for further processing are not well-developed and it is not clear that a program to encourage further processing would be successful.

Growth and development 
Levels of poverty in the province compared with other parts are Indonesia are relatively high. In 2010, 23% of the population were classified as poor (using very modest poverty lines of around $25 and $17 per person per month for urban and rural areas respectively) compared to the all-Indonesia average of 13.3%.  The numbers of street children in the province, for example, are relatively high. Localised food shortages are common. Around 50% of the children in the province suffer from stunting. The challenges of promoting development and lifting living standards in a rather isolated area of Indonesia such as NTT are considerable. The main problems of development include the following:

 Differences in living standards between urban and rural areas are large; rural poverty is widespread.
Agriculture is underdeveloped with little use of modern technology or capital, and poor access to markets
Deforestation, which exacerbates problems of water management and access to water in the province
Infrastructure in the province is underdeveloped. Roads are often poor, especially in rural areas. There is relatively little electricity throughout NTT; electricity use in 2010 was at the very low level of around 90 kWh per capita compared to the all-Indonesia rate of around 630 kWh (and often over 10,000 kWh per capita in the main OECD countries).
Access to water is a major problem. The province is dry for much of the year and in rural areas, many of the villages must rely on unreliable and untreated local springs and other sources for water supplies. The percentage of households relying on spring water was around 40% in 2010, the highest for any province in Indonesia and well above the all-Indonesia average of 14%. Water shortages are thus a major local social and political issue in the province.
Local education and medical facilities are poor and neglected. Although the numbers of schools and local medical clinics are adequate compared to other parts of Indonesia, the quality of services provided in these institutions is often poor. And in some areas, key facilities are absent; in mid-2014 it was reported that two districts (West Manggarai and East Manggarai) did not have general hospitals.
Resources available to the provincial and regency governments are very limited so it is difficult for local governments to improve the supply of public services.

Tourism 

The provincial government aims to promote tourism.  There are various interesting locations in the province. The basic infrastructure to support the tourist sector (such as transport facilities, accommodation, and adequate and reliable information) needs to be strengthened but several main features of the tourist sector in the province include:
Komodo Island with the well-known Komodo dragon
Kelimutu volcano on Flores which contains 3 striking crater lakes of varying colors
Mount Mutis to the east of Kupang, the highest point in the province and an area known for hiking & bird-watching
Semana Santa in Larantuka
Traditional housing and pasola in Sumba Island
Alor Dive in Alor Island
Nemberalla Beach in Rote Ndao
Pink Beach in Padar island
Taman 17 in Riung Island

In 2016 East Nusa Tenggara was awarded 6 medals from 10 categories listed in the Anugerah Pesona Indonesia 2016. These were:

 Most popular surfing spot:  Nemberala Beach, Rote Ndao Regency
 Most popular cleanliness spot: Nihiwatu Beach, West Sumba Regency
 Most popular of the historical site of Ende:  Bung Karno (Indonesia's proclaimer and first Indonesia's President) Site
 Most popular diving site: Alor Island, Alor Regency
Labuan Bajo - East of Greece
 Most popular attraction: Pasola, Southwest Sumba Regency
 Most popular highland area: three different color lakes/calderas at Mount Kelimutu, Ende.

Various local community groups in the province work to promote the local tourist industry although, as yet, many of these activities are still somewhat underdeveloped and need strengthening.

Well-known figures 

Well-known figures from the province include the following:

Adrianus Mooy, an economist who was governor of Bank Indonesia (1988–1993) and Executive Director of ESCAP
Ben Mboi, former East Nusa Tenggara governor
Frans Seda, a politician and finance minister (1966–1968) of Indonesia
Herman Johannes, scientist, government minister, and Rector of Gadjah Mada University (1961–1966)
Izaak Huru Doko, an independence fighter who organised resistance against the Dutch NICA (Netherlands-Indies Civil Administration) in the 1940s
Karina Nadila Niab, an actress, TV host and beauty queen, Puteri Indonesia Pariwisata 2017, represented Indonesia in Miss Supranational 2017.
Wilhelmus Zakaria Johannes, regarded as the first Indonesian radiologist in Indonesia.  The W.Z Johannes hospital in Kupang is named after him.

See also 

 List of rivers of East Nusa Tenggara

References

External links 

 
 Official website of the NTT Tourist Office
The NTT website of the Indonesian Central Statistics Bureau (Badan Pusat Statistik or BPS) which provides data on a range of matters in the province.  Especially helpful is the annual publication NTT dalam Angka [NTT in Figures] which provides very extensive statistics about a wide range of issues.
The quarterly reports of economic conditions in NTT issued by the provincial branch of Bank Indonesia.
The local Kupang newspaper Pos Kupang provides local news coverage of many provincial events.
Website on music from the islands of Roti and Lombok.

 
1958 establishments in Indonesia
Lesser Sunda Islands
Provinces of Indonesia
States and territories established in 1958